Lana Golob (born 26 October 1999) is a Slovenian footballer who plays as a defender for Pomigliano and the Slovenia national team.

Career
Golob has been capped for the Slovenia national team, appearing for the team during the 2019 FIFA Women's World Cup qualifying cycle.

References

External links
 Lana Golob at NZS 
 
 

1999 births
Living people
Slovenian women's footballers
Slovenia women's international footballers
Slovenian expatriate footballers
Women's association football defenders
Slovenian expatriate sportspeople in the United States
Expatriate women's soccer players in the United States
Slovenian expatriate sportspeople in Italy
Expatriate women's footballers in Italy
Slovenian expatriate sportspeople in Switzerland
Expatriate women's footballers in Switzerland
ŽNK Radomlje players
VCU Rams women's soccer players
ŽNK Mura players
S.S.D. Napoli Femminile players
FC Basel Frauen players
Pomigliano C.F. players
Serie A (women's football) players